Ture Holmberg (4 November 1886 – 7 April 1954) was a Swedish sports shooter. He competed in two events at the 1920 Summer Olympics.

References

External links
 

1886 births
1954 deaths
Swedish male sport shooters
Olympic shooters of Sweden
Shooters at the 1920 Summer Olympics
Sportspeople from Lund